Helene Elisabeth Billgren (née Åberg; born 1 June 1952 in Norrköping) is a Swedish artist. She has previously been married to Ernst Billgren, and their daughter is Elsa Billgren.

References

External links

1952 births
Swedish artists
Living people